The 2003 winners of the Torneo di Viareggio (in English, the Viareggio Tournament, officially the Viareggio Cup World Football Tournament Coppa Carnevale), the annual youth football tournament held in Viareggio, Tuscany, are listed below.

Format
The 40 teams are seeded in 10 pools, split up into 5-pool groups. Each team from a pool meets the others in a single tie. The winning club from each pool and three best runners-up from both group A and group B progress to the final knockout stage. All matches in the final rounds are single tie. The Round of 16 envisions penalties and no extra time, while the rest of the final round matches include 30 minutes extra time with Golden goal rule and penalties to be played if the draw between teams still holds. Semifinal losing teams play 3rd-place final with penalties after regular time. The winning sides play the final with extra time, no Golden goal rule and repeat the match if the draw holds.

Participating teams
Italian teams

  Ascoli
  Bari
  Benevento
  Brescia
  Brindisi
  Catania
  Cittadella
  Cosenza
  Empoli
  Florentia Viola
  Inter Milan
  Juventus
  Lazio
  Messina
  Milan
  Napoli
  Palermo
  Parma
  Perugia
  Reggina
  Roma
  Salernitana
  Ternana
  Torino
  Vicenza

European teams

  Bayern Munich
  Maccabi Haifa
  OFK Belgrade
  Obilić
  Slavia Prague
  Grasshoppers

American teams

  New York United
  Boca Juniors
  Costa Rica United
  Pumas
  Desportiva Capixaba
  Santos
  Marcilio Dias
  Irineu

Oceanian teams
  APIA Tigers

Group stage

Group 1

Group 2

Group 3

Group 4

Group 5

Group 6

Group 7

Group 8

Group 9

Group 10

Knockout stage

Champions

Notes

External links
 Official Site (Italian) 
 Results on RSSSF.com

2003
2003 in Brazilian football
2002–03 in Italian football
2002–03 in German football
2002–03 in Israeli football
2002–03 in Serbian football
2002–03 in Czech football
2002–03 in Swiss football
2002–03 in Argentine football
2003 in American soccer
2003 in Australian soccer
2002–03 in Mexican football